Derek Penman, QPM was HM Chief Inspector of Constabulary for Scotland between January 2014 and March 2018.

Penman joined Central Scotland Police as a cadet in 1982 rising to the rank of Chief Superintendent by 2007. In 2008 he became Assistant Chief Constable ( Crime and Specialist Operations) of Grampian Police. In 2011 he returned to Central as Deputy Chief Constable and was for a while Temporary Chief Constable before becoming Assistant Chief Constable (local policing, north) for the new Police Scotland.

Notes

Scottish police officers
Officers in Scottish police forces
Chief Inspectors of Constabulary (Scotland)
Law enforcement in Scotland
Living people
Scottish recipients of the Queen's Police Medal
Alumni of the University of Glasgow
Year of birth missing (living people)
British police chief officers